Philip or Phillip van Rensselaer may refer to the following members of the New York family:
Philip Kiliaen van Rensselaer (1747–1798), merchant
Philip S. Van Rensselaer (1767–1824), mayor

See also
Van Rensselaer (disambiguation)